Pheidole spathifera is a species of ant in the subfamily Myrmicinae. It is found in Asian countries.

Subspecies
Pheidole spathifera aspatha Forel, 1902 - India
Pheidole spathifera spathifera Forel, 1902 - Bangladesh, India, Thailand, China
Pheidole spathifera yerburyi Forel, 1902 - Myanmar, Sri Lanka

References

External links

 at antwiki.org
Animaldiversity.org
Itis.org

spathifera
Hymenoptera of Asia
Insects described in 1902